This is a list of cathedrals in Australia.

A cathedral church is a Christian place of worship which is the principal or "mother" church of a diocese and is distinguished as such by being the location for the cathedra or bishop's seat. In the strictest sense, only those Christian denominations with an episcopal hierarchy possess cathedrals. However, in common use, the term "cathedral" is often used for notable churches which were formerly part of an episcopal denomination.

It is a common misconception that "cathedral" may be applied to any particularly large or grand church. Whilst many cathedrals may be such, this is due to their ecclesiastical status. Such a church is usually grand because it is a cathedral, rather than it being designated a cathedral because of its grandeur. A cathedral may in fact be a relatively small building, particularly in sparser or poorer communities. Modern cathedrals frequently lack the grandeur of those of former times, having more focus on the functional aspects of a place of worship.

Some cathedrals were purpose-built, whilst others were formerly parochial (parish) churches which were subsequently promoted in status due to ecclesiastical requirements such as periodic diocesan reorganisation.

In this list the cathedrals are presented alphabetically by denomination. A list of former and never completed cathedrals is also included.

Anglican
The following Anglican cathedrals are located in Australia:

Former cathedrals

Assyrian
The following Assyrian Church of the East and Ancient Church of the East  cathedrals are located in Australia:

Catholic

Latin Church
The following Latin Church cathedrals of the Catholic Church in Australia are located in Australia:

Former and never completed Latin Rite cathedrals

Eastern Rites
The following Eastern Rite Catholic cathedrals are located in Australia:

Eastern Orthodox
The following Eastern Orthodox cathedrals are located in Australia:

Oriental Orthodox
The following Oriental Orthodox cathedrals are located in Australia:

See also

List of cathedrals

Sources
List of cathedrals in Australia by Giga-Catholic Information

References

Australia
Cathedrals
Cathedrals